This is a list of earthquakes in Mendoza Province.

References 
  Instituto Nacional de Prevención Sísmica. Listado de Terremotos Históricos.

 
Mendoza Province